"'As the Deer" is a praise and worship hymn song by Martin J. Nystrom, a native of Seattle. Written in 1984, this song is based on Psalm 42:1;

 "As the deer panteth for the water, so my soul longeth after Thee;

 You alone are my heart's desire, and I long to worship Thee"

References

External links 
As the Deer Guitar Tab

Contemporary Christian songs
1984 songs